Tumwine is a surname. Notable people with the surname include:

 Anne Mary Kobugabe Tumwine (born 1973), Ugandan teacher and politician
 Elly Tumwine (1954–2022), Ugandan professional artist, educator, and military officer
 Wilson Tumwine, Ugandan politician and businessman